John Martin Van Boxmeer  (born November 20, 1952) is a Canadian former professional ice hockey player. He has also served extensively as a hockey coach with various teams from 1984 to the present.

Bio
John Van Boxmeer was considered a top prospect, and was drafted 14th overall by the Montreal Canadiens in 1972. He was so highly regarded that he began his professional career by travelling to Moscow for the 1972 Summit Series at the request of tournament organizer Alan Eagleson, though he did not play in the famous series. He played 46 games for the Stanley Cup champion Canadiens in 1975–76, but his name was left off the cup as he did not appear in the playoffs. Ultimately, Van Boxmeer had a tough time making a Montreal lineup that was very deep in talent, and rather than spend the majority of his time in the minor leagues, he requested a trade. He was dealt to the Colorado Rockies in 1976 in exchange for a third round pick in the 1979 NHL Draft, which the Canadiens used to draft Craig Levie.

In Colorado, Van Boxmeer finally received the opportunity to establish himself as a full-time NHL player. He played all 80 games in the 1977–78 season, the only time the Rockies qualified for the playoffs in their history. When former Canadiens coach Scotty Bowman moved to the Buffalo Sabres, he acquired Van Boxmeer to bolster the Sabres' blueline, recalling how he had reluctantly traded the defenceman in 1976. To do so, he broke up the Sabres' famed "French Connection" line, sending René Robert to Colorado. Van Boxmeer responded with a plus-40 season and helped the Sabres climb to first place in their division, and the defenseman's best statistical seasons as a pro were in Buffalo.

With the emergence of Phil Housley on the Buffalo blueline, Van Boxmeer became expendable, and he was claimed by the Quebec Nordiques in the 1983 NHL waiver draft. He would spend the majority of his time during the 1983–84 season in the AHL, and played his final game with the Rochester Americans in 1984 before retiring.

Since retiring, he has served as the head coach of the Rochester Americans and the Long Beach Ice Dogs, and has also been an assistant coach at the NHL level with the Buffalo Sabres and Los Angeles Kings.  He won the Calder Cup as the head coach of Rochester in the 1986–87 season. He served as head coach of SC Bern of Switzerland's Nationalliga A until March 2009.

Van Boxmeer suffered a heart attack in August 2008, but recovered quickly and returned behind the SC Bern bench. He currently serves as an amateur scout for the Buffalo Sabres.

Van Boxmeer's son, Hank, was a defenceman who played for the State University of New York at Oswego Lakers. His daughter, Ashley, played college softball for the Cal State Fullerton Titans and for Canada at the 2008 Summer Olympics in Beijing.

Career statistics

Regular season and playoffs

International

References

External links
 

1952 births
Buffalo Sabres coaches
Buffalo Sabres players
Buffalo Sabres scouts
Canadian ice hockey defencemen
Canadian people of Dutch descent
Colorado Rockies (NHL) players
Fredericton Express players
Ice hockey people from Ontario
Living people
Los Angeles Kings coaches
Montreal Canadiens draft picks
Montreal Canadiens players
National Hockey League first-round draft picks
Nova Scotia Voyageurs players
People from Lambton County
Quebec Nordiques players
Rochester Americans coaches
Rochester Americans players
SC Bern coaches
Southern Ontario Junior A Hockey League players
Stanley Cup champions